Harpella is a genus of moths of the family Oecophoridae.

Species
The genus consists of the following species:
Harpella aerisella
Harpella ambiquellus
Harpella forficella
Harpella majorella
Harpella proboscidella
Harpella semnodoxa

Oecophoridae
Taxa named by Franz von Paula Schrank